Sarah Connolly (born 29 December 1981) is an Australian politician. She has been an Australian Labor Party member of the Victorian Legislative Assembly since 2018, representing the electorates of Tarneit (2018-2022) and Laverton (2022-present) in Melbourne's outer west.

Early life 
Connolly grew up in the coastal township of Kingscliff in northern New South Wales.

Connolly holds a B.L. from the University of Queensland and Graduate Diploma of Legal Practice from the Queensland University of Technology.

Early career 
Prior to entering into politics, Connolly has worked in the criminal justice system and as a judge’s associate and in a law firm. She also has experience working for the Australian Competition and Consumer Commission, Australian Energy Regulator and spent over a decade working across public and privately-owned energy networks in policy, legislative reform and regulatory frameworks.

Personal life 
Connolly is married to Scott Connolly, Assistant Secretary of the Australian Council of Trade Unions. Together they have three children.

Political career 
Connolly was pre-selected by the Labor Party as its candidate for Tarneit in 2017 and went on to be elected during the 2018 Victorian State Election. She is currently a Board Member of VicHealth, a member of the Transport Workers Union, and the Commonwealth Parliamentary Association.

She transferred to the new seat of Laverton, which had been established in a redistribution, at the 2022 election.

References

Living people
Australian Labor Party members of the Parliament of Victoria
Members of the Victorian Legislative Assembly
Women members of the Victorian Legislative Assembly
21st-century Australian politicians
Labor Right politicians
1981 births
University of Queensland alumni
Queensland University of Technology alumni
21st-century Australian women politicians